Matthew Tumilty (born 9 November 1993) is an English footballer who plays full back for Team Northumbria of the Northern League.

Career
Tumilty joined Sheffield Wednesday after a successful trial in 2010. He made his professional debut on 11 August 2011, in the Football League Cup 0–0 draw with Blackpool at Hillsborough, which the Owls eventually won on penalties. He came on as a second-half substitute for Danny Uchechi. He was then released by the club in 2012.

Tumilty went on to play for a number or Northern League clubs fininding his greatest success at Blyth AFC under the tutelage of Ian Skinner. 
Tumilty currently Plys his trade for Hebburn Town Fc who he has recently signed for. Tumilty has since left and is now commanding the back line at Burradon New Fordley.

References

External links

Morpeth Town Profile

1993 births
Footballers from Newcastle upon Tyne
Living people
English footballers
Association football defenders
Sheffield Wednesday F.C. players
Morpeth Town A.F.C. players
Team Northumbria F.C. players
English Football League players